99942 Apophis is a near-Earth asteroid and potentially hazardous asteroid with a diameter of  that caused a brief period of concern in December 2004 when initial observations indicated a probability up to 2.7% that it would hit Earth on April 13, 2029. Additional observations provided improved predictions that eliminated the possibility of an impact on Earth in 2029. This possibility kept it at Level 1 on the Torino impact hazard scale until August 2006, when the probability that Apophis would pass through the keyhole was determined to be very small and Apophis' rating on the Torino scale was lowered to zero. By 2008, the keyhole had been determined to be less than 1 km wide. During the short time when it had been of greatest concern, Apophis set the record for highest rating ever on the Torino scale, reaching level 4 on December 27, 2004.

Preliminary observations by Goldstone radar in January 2013 effectively ruled out the possibility of an Earth impact by Apophis in 2036. By May 6, 2013 (April 15, 2013, observation arc), the possibility of an impact on April 13, 2036 had been eliminated altogether. Apophis will make two modestly close approaches to Earth in 2036, but even the planet Venus will come closer to Earth in 2036. On April 12, 2068, the nominal trajectory has Apophis  from Earth. Entering March 2021, six asteroids each had a more notable cumulative Palermo Technical Impact Hazard Scale than Apophis, and none of those has a Torino level above 0. On average, an asteroid the size of Apophis (370 metres) is expected to impact Earth once in about 80,000 years. Observations in 2020 by the Subaru telescope confirmed David Vokrouhlický's 2015 Yarkovsky effect predictions. The Goldstone radar observed Apophis March 3–11, 2021, helping to refine the orbit again, and on March 25, 2021, the Jet Propulsion Laboratory announced that Apophis has no chance of impacting Earth in the next 100 years. The uncertainty in the 2029 approach distance has been reduced from hundreds of kilometers to now just a couple of kilometers, greatly enhancing predictions of future approaches. Apophis was removed altogether from the Sentry Risk Table the next day.

Discovery and naming 

Apophis was discovered on June 19, 2004, by Roy A. Tucker, David J. Tholen, and Fabrizio Bernardi at the Kitt Peak National Observatory. On December 21, 2004, Apophis passed  from Earth. Precovery observations from March 15, 2004, were identified on December 27, and an improved orbit solution was computed. Radar astrometry in January 2005 further refined its orbit solution. The discovery was notable in that it was at a very low solar elongation (56°) and at very long range (1.1 AU). See diagram below:

When first discovered, the object received the provisional designation , and early news and scientific articles naturally referred to it by that name. Once its orbit was sufficiently well calculated, it received the permanent number 99942 (on June 24, 2005). Receiving a permanent number made it eligible for naming by its discoverers, and they chose the name "Apophis" on July 19, 2005. Apophis is the Greek name of Apep, an enemy of the Ancient Egyptian sun-god Ra. He is the Uncreator, an evil serpent that dwells in the eternal darkness of the Duat and tries to swallow Ra during his nightly passage. Apep is held at bay by Set, the Ancient Egyptian god of storms and the desert.

Tholen and Tucker, two of the co-discoverers of the asteroid, are reportedly fans of the television series Stargate SG-1. One of the show's persistent villains is an alien named Apophis. He is one of the principal threats to the existence of civilization on Earth through the first few seasons, thus likely why the asteroid was named after him. In the fictional world of the show, the alien's backstory was that he had lived on Earth during ancient times and had posed as a god, thereby giving rise to the myth of the Egyptian god of the same name.

The mythological creature Apophis is pronounced with the accent on the first syllable (/ˈæpəfɪs/). In contrast, the asteroid's name is generally accented on the second syllable (/əˈpɒfɪs/) as the name was pronounced in the TV series.

Physical characteristics 

The mass estimate is more approximate than the diameter estimate, but should be accurate to within a factor of three. Apophis's surface composition probably matches that of LL chondrites.

Its rotation axis has an obliquity of −59° against the ecliptic, which means that Apophis is a retrograde rotator.

During the 2029 approach, Apophis's brightness will peak at magnitude 3.1, easily visible to the naked eye if one knows where to look, with a maximum angular speed of 42° per hour. The maximum apparent angular diameter will be ~2 arcseconds. This is roughly equivalent to the angular diameter of Neptune from earth. Therefore, the asteroid will be barely resolved by ground-based telescopes not equipped with adaptive optics but very well resolved by those that are. Due to the closeness of the approach, it is likely that tidal forces will alter Apophis's rotation axis. A partial resurfacing of the asteroid is possible, which might change its spectral class from a weathered Sq- to an unweathered Q-type.

Orbit 
Apophis has a low inclination orbit (3.3°) that varies from just outside the orbit of Venus (0.746 AU) to just outside the orbit of Earth (1.099 AU). After the 2029 Earth approach the orbit will vary from just inside of Earth's to just inside of Mars.

2029 close approach 
Using the June 2021 orbit solution which includes the Yarkovsky effect, the 3-sigma uncertainty region in the 2029 approach distance is about ±3.4 km. The distance, a hair's breadth in astronomical terms, is five times the radius of the Earth, ten times closer than the Moon, and closer than the ring of geostationary satellites currently orbiting the Earth. It will be the closest asteroid of its size in recorded history. On that date, it will become as bright as magnitude 3.1 (visible to the naked eye from rural as well as darker suburban areas, visible with binoculars from most locations). The close approach will be visible from Europe, Africa, and western Asia. During the approach, Earth will perturb Apophis from an Aten-class orbit with a semi-major axis of 0.92 AU to an Apollo-class orbit with a semi-major axis of 1.1 AU. Perihelion will lift from 0.746 AU to 0.894 AU and aphelion will lift from 1.099 AU to 1.31 AU.

2036 approaches 
In 2036 Apophis will approach the Earth at a third the distance of the Sun in both March and December.

2051 approach 

2066/2068 

In the 2060s Apophis will approach Earth in September 2066, and then from February 2067 to December 2071 Apophis will remain further from Earth than the Sun is.

By 2116 the JPL Small-Body Database and NEODyS close approach data start to become divergent.

Refinement of close approach predictions 
Six months after discovery, and shortly after a close approach to Earth on December 21, 2004, the improved orbital estimates led to the prediction of a very close approach on April 13, 2029, by both NASA's automatic Sentry system and NEODyS, a similar automatic program run by the University of Pisa and the University of Valladolid. Subsequent observations decreased the uncertainty in Apophis's trajectory. The probability of an impact event in 2029 temporarily climbed, peaking at 2.7% (1 in 37) on December 27, 2004, when the uncertainty region had shrunk to 83,000 km. This probability, combined with its size, caused Apophis to be assessed at level 4 on the Torino scale and 1.10 on the Palermo Technical Impact Hazard Scale, scales scientists use to represent how dangerous a given asteroid is to Earth. These are the highest values for which any object has been rated on either scale. The chance that there would be an impact in 2029 was eliminated by late December 27, 2004, as a result of a precovery image that extended the observation arc back to March 2004. The danger of a 2036 passage was lowered to level 0 on the Torino scale in August 2006. With a cumulative Palermo Scale rating of −3.22, the risk of impact from Apophis is less than one thousandth the background hazard level.

2005 and 2011 observations 
In July 2005, former Apollo astronaut Rusty Schweickart, as chairman of the B612 Foundation, formally asked NASA to investigate the possibility that the asteroid's post-2029 orbit could be in orbital resonance with Earth, which would increase the probability of future impacts. Schweickart also asked NASA to investigate whether a transponder should be placed on the asteroid to enable more accurate tracking of how its orbit is affected by the Yarkovsky effect. On January 31, 2011, astronomers took the first new images of Apophis in more than 3 years.

2013 refinement 
The close approach in 2029 will substantially alter the object's orbit, prompting Jon Giorgini of JPL to say in 2011: "If we get radar ranging in 2013 [the next good opportunity], we should be able to predict the location of  out to at least 2070." Apophis passed within  of Earth in 2013, allowing astronomers to refine the trajectory for future close passes. Just after the closest approach on January 9, 2013, the asteroid peaked at an apparent magnitude of about 15.6. The Goldstone radar observed Apophis during that approach from January 3 through January 17. The Arecibo Observatory observed Apophis once it entered Arecibo's declination window after February 13, 2013. The 2013 observations basically ruled out any chance of a 2036 impact.

A NASA assessment as of February 21, 2013, that did not use the January and February 2013 radar measurements gave an impact probability of 2.3 in a million for 2068. As of May 6, 2013, using observations through April 15, 2013, the odds of an impact on April 12, 2068, as calculated by the JPL Sentry risk table had increased slightly to 3.9 in a million (1 in 256,000).

2015 observations 
As of January 2019, Apophis had not been observed since 2015, mostly because its orbit has kept it very near the Sun from the perspective of Earth. It was not further than 60 degrees from the Sun between April 2014 and December 2019. With the early 2015 observations, the April 12, 2068, impact probability was 6.7 in a million (1 in 150,000), and the asteroid had a cumulative 9 in a million (1 in 110,000) chance of impacting Earth before 2106.

2020–21 observations 

No observations of Apophis were made between January 2015 and February 2019, and then observations started occurring regularly in January 2020. In March 2020, astronomers David Tholen and Davide Farnocchia measured the acceleration of Apophis due to the Yarkovsky effect for the first time, significantly improving the prediction of its orbit past the 2029 flyby. Tholen and Farnocchia found that the Yarkovsky effect caused Apophis to drift by about 170 meters per year. In late 2020, Apophis approached the Earth again. It passed  from Earth on March 6, 2021, brightening to +15 mag at the time. Radar observations of Apophis were planned at Goldstone in March 2021. The asteroid has been observed by NEOWISE (between December 2020 and April 2021) and by NEOSSat (in January 2021). Apophis was the target of an observing campaign by IAWN, resulting in the collection of light curves, spectra, and astrometry. The observations were used to practice and coordinate the response to an actual impact threat.

On February 21, 2021, Apophis was removed from the Sentry Risk Table, as an impact in the next 100 years was finally ruled out.

Several occultations of bright stars (apparent magnitude 8-11) by Apophis occurred in March and April 2021. A total of five separate occultations were observed successfully, marking the first time that an asteroid as small as Apophis was observed using the occultation method (beating the previous record set in 2019 by asteroid 3200 Phaeton by more than a factor of ten). The first event, on March 7, was successfully observed from the United States by multiple observers. The next potential occultation, which occurred on March 11, was predicted to be visible from central Europe. This event was missed, mainly due to bad weather (two negative observations were recorded from Greece). On March 22, another occultation was observed only by a single observer from the United States, amateur astronomer Roger Venable. Due to larger-than-expected residuals in the March 7 data, the majority of observers had been deployed outside of the actual path for the March 22 occultation. This single detection then allowed the prediction of several more events that would have been unobservable otherwise, including an occultation on April 4, which was observed from New Mexico, again by Venable, alongside others. Two more occultations, observable on April 10 and April 11 from Japan and New Mexico, respectively, were seen by several observers each.

On March 9, 2021, using radar observations from Goldstone taken on March 3–8 and three positive detections of the stellar occultation on March 7, 2021, Apophis became the asteroid with the most precisely measured Yarkovsky effect of all asteroids, at a signal-to-noise ratio (SNR) of 186.4, surpassing 101955 Bennu (SNR=181.6).

The 2021 apparition was the last opportunity to observe Apophis before its 2029 flyby.

History of impact estimates

Possible impact effects 
The Sentry Risk Table estimates that Apophis would impact Earth with kinetic energy equivalent to 1,200 megatons of TNT. 
In comparison, the Chicxulub impact which caused the mass extinction event responsible for wiping out the dinosaurs has been estimated to have released about as much energy as 100,000,000 megatons (100 teratons). The exact effects of any impact would vary based on the asteroid's composition, and the location and angle of impact. Any impact would be extremely detrimental to an area of thousands of square kilometres, but would be unlikely to have long-lasting global effects, such as the initiation of an impact winter. Assuming Apophis is a  stony asteroid with a density of 3,000 kg/m3, if it were to impact into sedimentary rock, Apophis would create a  impact crater.

Expired 2036 path of risk
In 2008, the B612 Foundation made estimates of Apophis's path if a 2036 Earth impact were to occur, as part of an effort to develop viable deflection strategies. The result was a narrow corridor a few kilometres wide, called the "path of risk", extending across southern Russia, across the north Pacific (relatively close to the coastlines of California and Mexico), then right between Nicaragua and Costa Rica, crossing northern Colombia and Venezuela, ending in the Atlantic, just before reaching Africa. Using the computer simulation tool NEOSim, it was estimated that the hypothetical impact of Apophis in countries such as Colombia and Venezuela, which were in the path of risk, could have more than 10 million casualties.

Exploration

OSIRIS-APEX post-Earth-encounter rendezvous 
The OSIRIS-REx spacecraft is expected to return a sample of Bennu to Earth in 2023. After ejecting the sample canister, the spacecraft can use its remaining fuel to target another body during an extended mission. Apophis is the only asteroid which the spacecraft could reach for a long-duration rendezvous, rather than a brief flyby. In April 2022, the extension was approved, and OSIRIS-REx will perform a rendezvous with Apophis in April 2029, a few days after the close approach to Earth. It will study the asteroid for 18 months and perform a maneuver similar to the one it made during sample collection at Bennu, by approaching the surface and firing its thrusters. This will expose the asteroid's subsurface and allow mission scientists to learn more about the asteroid's material properties. For its Apophis mission after the sample return, OSIRIS-REx will be renamed OSIRIS-APEX (short for OSIRIS-Apophis Explorer).

Other proposed space missions

Planetary Society competition 

In 2007, The Planetary Society, a California-based space advocacy group, organized a $50,000 competition to design an uncrewed space probe that would 'shadow' Apophis for almost a year, taking measurements that would "determine whether it will impact Earth, thus helping governments decide whether to mount a deflection mission to alter its orbit". The society received 37 entries from 20 countries on 6 continents.

The commercial competition was won by a design called 'Foresight' created by SpaceWorks Enterprises, Inc. SpaceWorks proposed a simple orbiter with only two instruments and a radio beacon at a cost of ~US$140 million, launched aboard a Minotaur IV between 2012 and 2014, to arrive at Apophis five to ten months later. It would then rendezvous with, observe, and track the asteroid. Foresight would orbit the asteroid to gather data with a multi-spectral imager for one month. The spacecraft would use laser ranging to the asteroid and radio tracking from Earth for ten months to accurately determine the asteroid's orbit and how it might change.

Pharos, the winning student entry, would be an orbiter with four science instruments (a multi-spectral imager, near-infrared spectrometer, laser rangefinder, and magnetometer) that would rendezvous with and track Apophis. Earth-based tracking of the spacecraft would then allow precise tracking of the asteroid. The Pharos spacecraft would also carry four instrumented probes that it would launch individually over the course of two weeks. Accelerometers and temperature sensors on the probes would measure the seismic effects of successive probe impacts, a creative way to explore the interior structure and dynamics of the asteroid.

Second place, for $10,000, went to a European team led by Deimos Space S.L. of Madrid, Spain, in cooperation with EADS Astrium, Friedrichshafen, Germany; University of Stuttgart, Germany; and University of Pisa, Italy. Juan L. Cano was principal investigator.

Another European team took home $5,000 for third place. Their team lead was EADS Astrium Ltd, United Kingdom, in conjunction with EADS Astrium SAS, France; IASF-Roma, INAF, Rome, Italy; Open University, UK; Rheinisches Institut für Umweltforschung, Germany; Royal Observatory of Belgium; and Telespazio, Italy. The principal investigator was Paolo D'Arrigo.

Two teams tied for second place in the Student Category: Monash University, Clayton Campus, Australia, with Dilani Kahawala as principal investigator; and University of Michigan, with Jeremy Hollander as principal investigator. Each second-place team won $2,000. A team from Hong Kong Polytechnic University and Hong Kong University of Science and Technology, under the leadership of Peter Weiss, received an honorable mention and $1,000 for the most innovative student proposal.

Don Quijote mission 
Apophis is one of two asteroids that were considered by the European Space Agency as the target of its Don Quijote mission concept to study the effects of impacting an asteroid.

Cancelled Chinese mission 
China had planned an encounter with Apophis in 2022, several years prior to the close approach in 2029. This mission, now known as ZhengHe, would have included exploration and close study of three asteroids including an extended encounter with Apophis for close observation, and land on the asteroid 1996 FG3 to conduct in situ sampling analysis on the surface. The launch date is now scheduled for 2024, with a different set of targets.

Proposed deflection strategies 

Studies by NASA, ESA, and various research groups in addition to the Planetary Society contest teams, have described a number of proposals for deflecting Apophis or similar objects, including gravitational tractor, kinetic impact, and nuclear bomb methods.

On December 30, 2009, Anatoly Perminov, the director of the Russian Federal Space Agency, said in an interview that Roscosmos will also study designs for a possible deflection mission to Apophis.

On August 16, 2011, researchers at China's Tsinghua University proposed launching a mission to knock Apophis onto a safer course using an impactor spacecraft in a retrograde orbit, steered and powered by a solar sail. Instead of moving the asteroid on its potential resonant return to Earth, Shengping Gong and his team believe the secret is shifting the asteroid away from entering the gravitational keyhole in the first place.

On February 15, 2016, Sabit Saitgarayev, of the Makeyev Rocket Design Bureau, announced intentions to use Russian ICBMs to target relatively small near-Earth objects. Although the report stated that likely targets would be between the 20 to 50 metres in size, it was also stated that 99942 Apophis would be an object subject to tests by the program.

In October 2022, a method of mapping the insides of a potentially problematic asteroid, such as 99942 Apophis, in order to determine the best area for impact was proposed.

Popular culture 
In Id Software's video game Rage, the backstory involves the asteroid colliding with Earth on August 23, 2029. The asteroid almost wipes out the human race and ushers in a post-apocalyptic age.

The Enter Shikari song, 'Zzzonked' makes reference to the asteroid in the second verse.

The Type O Negative song "The Profit Of Doom" references the asteroid.

The cleopatrick song “OK” references the asteroid.

The Mr So & So song Apophis was written about the asteroid.

See also 

 Asteroid capture
 Asteroid impact prediction
 Asteroid Redirect Mission
 Earth-grazing fireball
 List of impact craters on Earth
 NEO Surveyor
 Apophis

Notes

References

External links 

 
 Apophis Asteroid
 Asteroid Apophis orbit from recent observations, EPSC Abstracts Vol. 6, EPSC-DPS2011-1212, 2011, EPSC-DPS Joint Meeting 2011
 Diagrams and orbits of Apophis (Sormano Astronomical Observatory)
 Interactive 3D gravity simulation of Apophis's 2029 Earth flyby

Risk assessment
 Apophis Orbital Prediction Page at NASA JPL
 99942 Apophis page from NEODyS
 MBPL – Minor Body Priority List (technical List) at Sormano Observatory
 TECA – Table of Asteroids Next Closest Approaches to the Earth at Sormano Observatory

NASA
 Possibility of an Earth Impact in 2029 Ruled Out for Asteroid  (JPL)
 Radar Observations Refine the Future Motion of Asteroid  (JPL)
 Animation explaining how impact risk is determined from Impact Probability
 

099942
Discoveries by Roy A. Tucker
Discoveries by David J. Tholen
Discoveries by Fabrizio Bernardi
Named minor planets
099942
099942
Earth-crossing asteroids
099942
20040619